Harri Lorenzi (born 1949) is a Brazilian agronomic engineer, author on trees of the Atlantic Mata and a collaborating agronomist of the garden of Fazenda Cresciumal, Ruy De Souza Queiroz. Between his workmanships, he published four books in the end of the 1990s, they consist of: Brazilian palms, Brazilian Trees (1 and 2, also in English), Tropical Plants of Burle Marx and Brazilian Ornamental Plants.

In 2012, he was honoured when botanist E. G. Gonç. first described and published Lorenzia, which is a genus of plants in the family Araceae.

References

1949 births
Living people
Botanists with author abbreviations
Lorenzi, Harri
Lorenzi, Harri
Lorenzi, Harri
Lorenzi, Harri
21st-century Brazilian botanists